King of the Wild  is a 1931 American pre-Code Mascot movie serial. The complete serial is available on DVD from Alpha Video.

A seven-reel feature version of the serial was later released in South America under the title Bimi.

Plot
Robert Grant, framed for a coup in the Indian country of Ranjapur, escapes from prison to Africa in search of the real villains.  Here he meets Sheik Mustapha (Boris Karloff), who has evidence to clear him and the location of a secret diamond mine.

Cast
Walter Miller as Robert Grant, American escapee from Ranjapur
Nora Lane as Muriel Armitage, Tom Armitage's sister
Dorothy Christy as Mrs LaSalle
Tom Santschi as Harris, Villainous Animal trapper
Boris Karloff as Mustapha, an African sheikh
Arthur McLaglen as Bimi, the Ape man
Carroll Nye as Tom Armitage, Muriel's brother who knows the location of a secret diamond mine
Victor Potel as Peterson
Albert DeWinton as Cyril Wainwright
Martha Lalande as Mrs Colby
Mischa Auer as Dakka, an escaped lunatic
Lafe McKee as Officer

Production
The stars of King of the Wild were originally intended to be Harry Carey and Edwina Booth, but filming on the MGM film Trader Horn (1931) went over-schedule, forcing Mascot to recast the serial with Walter Miller and Nora Lane instead.

Also appearing in the serial was real-life explorer Albert DeWinton. He later went after explorer Percy Fawcett, who had disappeared in Brazil several years earlier. DeWinton also disappeared in the Amazon in early 1934 and was presumed dead. Bimi, the Ape Man, was played by actor Victor McLaglen's brother Arthur, and Mischa Auer plays an escaped lunatic named Dakka.

King of the Wild is sometimes misreported as an alternate title for the serial King of the Kongo, which also co-starred Boris Karloff.

Chapter titles
 Man Eaters
 Tiger of Destiny
 The Avenging Horde
 Secret of the Volcano
 Pit of Peril
 Creeping Doom
 Sealed Lips
 Jaws of the Jungle
 Door of Dread
 Leopard's Lair
 The Fire of the Gods
 Jungle Justice
Source:

See also
 Boris Karloff filmography
 List of film serials by year
 List of film serials by studio

References

External links

1931 films
1930s English-language films
1931 adventure films
American black-and-white films
Mascot Pictures film serials
Films directed by B. Reeves Eason
Films directed by Richard Thorpe
Films produced by Nat Levine
American adventure films
1930s American films